Pipestone, Manitoba is a community in southwestern Manitoba, Canada. 

It is mainly an agricultural area with some oil drilling nearby.

Pipestone is part of the Rural Municipality of Pipestone. The office for the municipality is located in Reston, approximately 10 kilometers west on Highway 2.

It was the birthplace of John Hamilton Roberts, who commanded the landing forces in the Dieppe Raid in 1942.

There is an amateur video of a large destructive tornado that passed through farm fields near Pipestone on June 23, 2007, and another on July 23, 2008.

An oil spill the size of two football fields was discovered near Pipestone in January 2012. 
More than 100,000 litres of oil seeped into surrounding farmland as a result of a broken pipe.

See also
Pipestone Creek (Saskatchewan)

References

 Geographical Names of Manitoba - Pipestone (page 214) - the Millennium Bureau of Canada

Unincorporated communities in Westman Region